Owen Ncube is a Zimbabwean politician. He served as the country's Minister of State for National Security from September 2018 to January 2022.

Prior to his appointment to the role of minister of state for national security, Ncube was named the minister of state for Midlands Province upon President Emmerson Mnangagwa's ascension to power in 2017. Prior to his appointment to Zimbabwe's cabinet, Ncube served as Midland's provincial ZANU–PF youth league secretary for administration.

Under Ncube's leadership as national security minister, a crackdown was ordered against demonstrators who were protesting a 150 percent fuel hike in January 2019. Twelve people were killed during the protests. News reports documented at least sixty other people who were shot during the protests, tear gas was used by police against demonstrators and 600 people were arrested. An internet blackout was ordered by Ncube as the police and armed forces responded to the demonstrations, a decision that was later ruled to be an over-extension of power by a High Court judge.

Following the protests, Ncube was placed on a list of people banned from entry into the United States. He was also sanctioned by the U.S. Treasury Department. A sanctioned individual has their American assets frozen and firms that operate in the United States, or make payment in U.S. dollars, can not easily financially interact with people on the sanctioned list. On 1 February 2021, the United Kingdom imposed a travel ban and freezing of assets on Ncube, Isaac Moyo, Godwin Matanga, and Anselem Sanyatwe.

On 10 January 2022, President Mnangagwa dismissed Ncube as Minister of State for National Security. In a statement, Chief Secretary to the President and Cabinet, Misheck Sibanda, said Ncube had been removed for “conduct inappropriate for a Minister of Government”

References

Year of birth missing (living people)
Living people
21st-century Zimbabwean politicians
Zimbabwean politicians
Government ministers of Zimbabwe
ZANU–PF politicians
Zimbabwean individuals subject to U.S. Department of the Treasury sanctions
Zimbabwean individuals subject to United Kingdom sanctions